Nicholas Selby (born James Ivor Selby, 13 September 1925 – 14 September 2010) was a British film, television and theatre actor. He appeared in more than one hundred television dramas on the BBC and ITV during the course of his career, including Our Friends in the North, Poldark and House of Cards. Selby was also a long-standing member of the Royal Shakespeare Company.

Selby was born in Holborn, London on 13 September 1925. He served in the British Army during World War II, making his stage debut in Dangerous Corner at Preston, Lancashire, for the forces' entertainment organisation ENSA. In 1948 he enrolled at the Central School of Speech and Drama, receiving commendation for his student performance in Mary Hayley Bell's Men in Shadow. There then followed seasons in repertory at Liverpool, Birmingham, Coventry, York, Hornchurch and Cambridge. His first professional West End appearance was in 1959, in William Douglas-Home's Aunt Edwina, followed by his creation of the hit-man Ben in the London premiere of Harold Pinter's The Dumb Waiter at the Hampstead Theatre Club in January 1960. In 1963 Selby made his first appearances for the Royal Shakespeare Company, as Casca in Julius Caesar, the Bishop of Winchester in The Wars of The Roses and Antonio in The Tempest. His association with the company lasted for ten years, until he followed Peter Hall to the new National Theatre in London in 1976. In his first season there he appeared as Menander in Tamburlaine and the Captain in Tales from the Vienna Woods. He was van Swieten in the inaugural production Amadeus and the parliamentary Speaker in The Madness of George III. His last stage role was as Dilly Knox in Breaking the Code in 1987.

Selby died in London on 14 September 2010, at the age of 85. He was predeceased by his wife, Kathleen Rayner, for whom he had been caring during her ill-health for many years, and was survived by their daughter, Alison, and two grandchildren.

Filmography

References

External links

1925 births
2010 deaths
English male soap opera actors
English male stage actors
English male film actors
People from Holborn
Alumni of the Royal Central School of Speech and Drama
British Army personnel of World War II
Male actors from London
Royal Shakespeare Company members